Rajnikant Mani Tripathi is an Indian politician and a member of 17th Legislative Assembly of Kushinagar, Uttar Pradesh of India. He represents the Kushinagar constituency of Uttar Pradesh and is a member of the Bharatiya Janata Party.

Early life and education
Tripathi was born (24 August 1958) in Deoria, Kushinagar to his father Shri Panish Mani Tripathi. He married Shashi Prabha in 1984. He belongs to Brahmin caste. He had Post Graduate degree from Banaras Hindu University. He got BA degree in 1980, MA in 1982 and LLB in 1987.

Political career
Tripathi has been a member of the 17th Legislative Assembly of Uttar Pradesh. Since 2017, he has represented the Kushinagar constituency and is a member of the BJP. He defeated Bahujan Samaj Party candidate Rajesh Pratap Rao "Team Banti Bhaiya " by a margin of 48,103 votes.

Posts held

See also
Uttar Pradesh Legislative Assembly

References

Uttar Pradesh MLAs 2017–2022
Bharatiya Janata Party politicians from Uttar Pradesh
Living people
1970 births